Timothy Robert Johns (born July 17, 1948) is an American politician and a Republican member of the South Dakota Senate.  He previously served as a member of the South Dakota House of Representatives representing District 31 from January 11, 2013 to January 12, 2021.

Education
Johns earned his Bachelor of Arts degrees in political science and sociology from Northern State University and his JD from the University of South Dakota School of Law.

Election history
2020     Johns was elected with 9,911 votes to the South Dakota Senate, running unopposed in the general election.  Johns defeated John Teupel in the Republican primary; Johns received 2,020 votes and Teupel received 1,423 votes.
2018     Johns was re-elected with 6,879 votes; Charles Turbiville was elected with 5,040 votes and Naveen Malik received 3,789 votes and Wyatt Osthus received 2,539 votes.
2016     Johns was re-elected with 7,359; Charles Turbiville was elected with 6,136 votes.
2014     Johns was re-elected with 4,912 votes; Fred Romkema was also re-elected with 5,550 votes.
2012 When Republican Representative Charles Turbiville was term limited and left a District 31 seat open, Johns ran in the four-way June 5, 2012 Republican Primary and placed second with 1,169 votes (25.1%); Johns and incumbent Republican Representative Fred Romkema were unopposed for the November 6, 2012 General election, where Representative Romkema took the first seat and Johns took the second seat with 6,213 votes (48.04%).

References

External links
Official page at the South Dakota Legislature
 

Place of birth missing (living people)
Living people
Republican Party members of the South Dakota House of Representatives
Northern State University alumni
People from Lead, South Dakota
South Dakota lawyers
University of South Dakota alumni
1948 births
21st-century American politicians